Mohn is a German word for poppy. It may also refer to:

 Mohn (surname), a list of people
 Mohn Basin, Ross Dependency, Antarctica
 Mohn Peaks, two peaks in Palmer Land, Antarctica
 Mohn Islands,  in the Kara Sea
 Mohn (Pokémon), a character in Pokémon series.
Poppy seed filling, also known as Mohn or mon in Yiddish